Glyka Nera (Greek: Γλυκά Νερά, meaning "sweet waters", named after an underground water source) is a suburb in the northeastern part of Athens Metropolitan Area. Since the 2011 local government reform it belongs to the East Attica regional unit and is part of the municipality Paiania, of which it is a municipal unit. The municipal unit has an area of 9.238 km2.

Geography

Glyka Nera is situated on the eastern slope of the northernmost part of the forested Hymettus mountain. It is 11 km east of central Athens, and 11 km northwest of the Eleftherios Venizelos International Airport. Adjacent towns are Gerakas to the northeast and Paiania to the south. Motorway 64 passes north of the town.

Historical population

Gallery

See also
List of municipalities of Attica

References

External links

Official website 
Former official website, archived 

Populated places in East Attica